John Grey Weightman (29 March 1809 – 9 December 1872) was a British architect based in Sheffield.

Career
He was born on 29 March 1809 in Bawtry, West Riding of Yorkshire, the son of Robert Weightman and Mary Gray.

He trained in the offices of Charles Barry and Charles Robert Cockerell. Initially he practised alone in Sheffield from around 1832, but by 1834 he was working with Matthew Ellison Hadfield before entering a formal partnership in 1838 which lasted until 1858, after which he practised alone.

He married Mary Elizabeth Collinson (1802-1884). He died in Collingham, Nottinghamshire on 9 December 1872.

Works

References

19th-century English architects
1809 births
1872 deaths
People from Bawtry
Architects from Yorkshire